Stade Olympique Châtellerault is a French association football club founded in 1914. It is based in Châtellerault, Nouvelle-Aquitaine, France and plays in the Championnat National 3. It plays at the Stade de la Montée Rouge in Châtellerault, which has a capacity of 8,033.

Season-by-Season

External links
 SO Châtellerault Official Website

Association football clubs established in 1914
1914 establishments in France
Sport in Vienne
Football clubs in Nouvelle-Aquitaine